White Lie is a South Korean television series starring Shin Eun-kyung, Kim Hae-sook, Kim Yu-seok, Kim Tae-hyun and Im Ji-eun. The morning daily drama aired on MBC on Mondays to Fridays at 7:50 a.m. from December 1, 2008 to July 10, 2009 for 159 episodes.

White Lie recorded ratings of over 20% — unusually popular for a morning show. It was also shortlisted for Best Telenovela at the International Emmys.

Plot
Seo Eun-young (Shin Eun-kyung) is happily engaged to marry Kang Jung-woo (Kim Yu-seok) until he suddenly dumps her to marry a rich woman, Hong Na-kyung (Im Ji-eun). Eun-young, alone and pregnant, is left behind as her ex-fiancé and his new bride go abroad. Managing to get a job as a nurse at a hospital, she supports herself while five years go by.

Meanwhile, one of her patients, Kang Hyung-woo (Kim Tae-hyun) falls in love with her and wholeheartedly pursues her. With Hyung-woo's wealthy mother Madam Shin, a department store owner, in support of the match, Eun-young has no reason to refuse him beyond her memories of Jung-woo. But then Jung-woo suddenly returns, and Eun-young discovers that Hyung-woo is his half-brother. Hyung-woo is autistic, and with Eun-young, he is able to express himself and open his mind to the world. And though Eun-young initially marries him for money and revenge, with time she starts to genuinely love Hyung-woo.

Cast
Seo family
 Shin Eun-kyung as Seo Eun-young 
 Yoon Hye-kyung as Seo Bo-young (sister) 
 Ahn Suk-hwan as Seo Heo-gu (father)
 Kim Hye-ok as Na Jin-sun (mother)

Kang family
 Kim Yu-seok as Kang Jung-woo 
 Im Ji-eun as Hong Na-kyung (Jung-woo's wife)
 Kim Young-ran as Joo Ae-sook (Jung-woo's birth mother)

Madam Shin's family
 Kim Tae-hyun as Kang Hyung-woo (Jung-woo's half brother)
 Jung Yoon-jo as Kang Shin-woo (Jung-woo's half sister)
 Kim Hae-sook as Shin Jung-wook, or Madam Shin (Hyung-woo and Shin-woo's mother)

Extended cast
 Kim Jin as Joo Hong-jin 
 Jung Hee-tae as Ahn Bi-seo
 Lee Eun-soo as Hwang Bi-an 
 Kang Suk-jung as Cha Min-jae (photographer)
 Ha Ji-young as Ms. Han
 Song Ji-eun as Song Yeon-hee (Madam Shin's new housekeeper)
 Seol Ji-yoon as Lawyer Kang
 Min Joon-hyun as doctor
 Seo Dong-hyun as Bi-an's friend
 Han Young-kwang
 Heo Tae-hee

International Broadcast
 The series has been aired in 2012 in the Philippines via TV5, airing weekday afternoons at 2:45pm.
 The series has been aired since 2021 in the United States via MBC Drama America, airing weeknights at 10:20PM (EST).

See also
Munhwa Broadcasting Corporation
List of South Korean television series

References

External links
 
White Lie at MBC Global Media

MBC TV television dramas
2008 South Korean television series debuts
2009 South Korean television series endings
Korean-language television shows
South Korean romance television series